Banga Bibhushan Samman is a title instituted by the West Bengal government to honour the services of personalities in various fields. The Banga Ratna Samman and the Banga Bhushan Samman ("Bengal ornament" বঙ্গ ভূষণ) awards are also granted.

The award was conceived by Mamata Banerjee, Chief Minister of West Bengal, on 25 July 2011.

List of awardees

2011

2012

In May 2012, The Sunday Indian reported that Ravi Shankar had refused the award.

2013

2018
The Banga Bibhushan of 2018 was awarded on 21 May, to the following:

2022

Note:

See also
Banga Bhushan
Rabindra Puraskar

References

External links 
 Bangabibhushan Title Winners 2012

Awards established in 2011
Civil awards and decorations of West Bengal